The following elections occurred in the year 1900.

Europe
 1900 Norwegian parliamentary election
 1900 Portuguese legislative election
 1900 Italian general election

United Kingdom
 1900 United Kingdom general election
 List of MPs elected in the 1900 United Kingdom general election
 1900 Portsmouth by-election
 1900 Rossendale by-election
 1900 Wilton by-election

North America

Canada
 1900 Canadian federal election
 1900 British Columbia general election
 1900 Edmonton municipal election
 1900 Newfoundland general election
 1900 Prince Edward Island general election
 1900 Quebec general election
 1900 Yukon general election

Caribbean
 1900 Cuban local elections

United States
 1900 New York state election
 1900 South Carolina gubernatorial election
 1900 United States House of Representatives elections
 United States House of Representatives elections in California, 1900
 United States House of Representatives elections in South Carolina, 1900
 1900 United States presidential election
 1900 and 1901 United States Senate elections

Oceania

New Zealand
 1900 City of Auckland by-election
 1900 Otaki by-election
 1900 Waihemo by-election

See also
 :Category:1900 elections

1900
Elections